Philip J. Zink (October 23, 1870 – February 2, 1944) was an American politician and military officer.

Born in Beaver Dam, Wisconsin, Zink served in the Wisconsin National Guard and was in the Spanish–American War, the Mexican Border Campaign, and World War I. His rank was lieutenant colonel. Zink was a woolen weaver. He served on the school board and on the Beaver Dam Police and Fire Commission. In 1927, Zink served in the Wisconsin State Assembly and was a Democrat. Zink died at the Wood, Wisconsin veterans hospital in Milwaukee.

References

1870 births
1944 deaths
Politicians from Beaver Dam, Wisconsin
Military personnel from Wisconsin
School board members in Wisconsin
Democratic Party members of the Wisconsin State Assembly